Jitender Mahajan is an Indian politician who currently serves as a member of the Delhi Legislative Assembly, representing the Rohtas Nagar Assembly constituency. He is member of the Bharatiya Janata Party.

Electoral performance

References 

 Jitender Mahajan(Bharatiya Janata Party(BJP)):Constituency- ROHTAS NAGAR(NORTH-EAST)
 Rohtas Nagar Assembly Election 2020 Results
 Jitender Mahajan - Delhi Election 2020 - Firstpost

Delhi MLAs 2020–2025
Bharatiya Janata Party politicians from Delhi
Year of birth missing (living people)
Living people